Red Sparrow is a 2018 American spy thriller film directed by Francis Lawrence and written by Justin Haythe, based on the 2013 novel of the same name by Jason Matthews. The film stars Jennifer Lawrence, Joel Edgerton, Matthias Schoenaerts, Charlotte Rampling, Mary-Louise Parker, and Jeremy Irons. It tells the story of a Russian intelligence officer, who is sent to make contact with a CIA officer in the hope of discovering the identity of a mole.

Matthews, a former member of the CIA, advised the production on the depiction of spying. Based on historic Soviet sexpionage and contemporary Russian use of kompromat, filming took place in Hungary, Slovakia and Austria.

Red Sparrow premiered at the Newseum in Washington, D.C. on February 15, 2018, and was released in the United States on March 2, 2018. The film grossed $151 million worldwide, becoming a modest box-office success, and received mixed reviews from critics, who described it as having "more style than substance" and criticized the film's long runtime and over-reliance on graphic violence and sex, although Lawrence's performance was praised.

Plot
In modern-day Russia, beautiful Dominika Egorova is a famous ballerina who supports her ill mother. Following a career-ending injury, Dominika is approached by her uncle Ivan, the deputy director of the SVR. She is tasked with seducing Dimitry Ustinov, a Russian gangster, in exchange for her mother's continued medical care. Meeting at a bar, the two go to her private room, where he rapes her. During this act, he is killed by Sergei Matorin, an SVR operative authorized by Ivan. Ivan offers Dominika a choice: become an SVR operative, or be executed for witnessing Ustinov's assassination.

Nate Nash is a CIA operative working in Moscow. While meeting with an asset in Gorky Park, they are confronted by the police. Nash creates a diversion to ensure his asset, a Russian mole code-named Marble, escapes unidentified. Nash is reassigned to the U.S. but insists he is the only person with whom Marble will work. Since he cannot return to Russia, he is assigned to Budapest to reestablish contact with Marble, which the SVR also deduce.

Dominika is sent to State School 4, a brutal specialist training school for "Sparrows"—SVR operatives capable of seducing their targets with sexpionage. Dominika excels in her training, despite some friction with her trainer, known only as the Matron. Against the Matron's recommendation, Ivan and General Korchnoi decide that Dominika is ready for an assignment in Budapest—to gain Nash's trust and expose Marble's identity.

In Budapest, Dominika lives with another sparrow named Marta Yelenova, and is supervised by SVR station chief Maxim Volontov. Dominika makes contact with Nash, who quickly determines she is a Russian intelligence operative and attempts to convince her to defect.

Dominika inspects Marta's room and realizes that Marta has been assigned to buy classified intelligence from Stephanie Boucher, the chief of staff to a U.S. Senator. When Ivan pressures Dominika about her slow progress with Nash, Dominika claims to be helping Marta with Boucher as well. Marta is brutally killed by the SVR for learning about Dominaka's earlier incident with the gangster. Dominika is then warned this will happen to her if she fails. Dominika contacts Nash, agrees to become a double agent in exchange for protection for her and her mother, and has sex with him. Under Russian orders, Dominika travels to London with Volontov to meet Boucher and complete the trade, but covertly switches out the intelligence Boucher supplies with CIA-supplied disinformation.

When she leaves the meeting, Boucher realizes that she is being observed by American intelligence agents; she panics, backs into traffic, and is struck and killed. Russian agents observing Boucher realize their mission has been compromised. Suspected of tipping off the Americans, Dominika and Volontov are recalled to Moscow where they are tortured and interrogated for days. Volontov is executed, but Dominika's claims of innocence are eventually believed by Ivan, and she is allowed to return to Budapest to continue her original mission of extracting Marble's identity from Nash. Instead, she convinces Nash to relocate her and her mother to America.

After spending the night with Nash, Dominika awakes to find him being tortured by Matorin for Marble's identity. She initially assists Matorin with torturing Nash until Matorin lowers his guard and she kills him, but is badly injured while doing so. She wakes in a hospital where General Vladimir Korchnoi, a high-ranking official working with Ivan, reveals himself as Marble. He explains that he was initially patriotic, but became disillusioned by Russia's corruption when a bureaucrat he had once offended refused to allow an American doctor to operate on his sick wife. He fears he will be caught soon and, instead of dying in vain, instructs Dominika to expose his identity to Ivan. Doing so would make her a national hero, and allow her to replace him as a mole passing critical intelligence to the CIA. But when Dominika contacts her superiors, she frames Ivan as the mole instead, using evidence she had been fabricating since she first arrived in Hungary, and blaming him for the botched exchange in London. Ivan is killed and Dominika is honored in a Russian military ceremony attended by Korchnoi.

Back in Russia, Dominika lives with her mother, and receives a phone call from an unknown person who plays Grieg's piano concerto, which she previously had told Nash was the piece to which she danced her first solo performance.

Cast

Production

Development
After Jason Matthews' book Red Sparrow was published in 2013, 20th Century Fox purchased the film rights, and signed Francis Lawrence to direct. Matthews said the idea of "sparrows" and a "sparrow school" was based on State School 4 in the Soviet Union, though Russian "sexpionage" is now done by women contracted outside of spy agencies. The Russian concept of kompromat was also influential. Francis worked on adapting Matthews' book in 2015, and has said that at the time, he had reservations about the timelines of a Cold War story.

Screenwriter Justin Haythe reduced the number of narrators and shifting perspectives in the novel, concentrating on Dominika. Russian President Vladimir Putin, who appears in the novel, was also cut from the adaptation, due to Francis Lawrence's belief that it would be a distraction to have an actor play the highly public figure.

Matthews, who said he based his book on his experiences in the CIA, was also hired as technical advisor, to supervise the accuracy of the depiction of espionage. He had the Gorky Park scene rewritten to depict espionage methods more accurately.

Casting
Francis Lawrence presented the screenplay to Jennifer Lawrence, who accepted the part. She stated she admired the character and his direction, with her sole point of hesitation being the "really sexual" nature of the character. They met to discuss the nude scenes. In 2014, Jennifer Lawrence had private nude photos stolen in the iCloud leaks. However, she drew a distinction between the film and the leak based on her consent to the film, as opposed to the leak. Lawrence explained: "The insecurity and fear of being judged for getting nude, what I went through, should that dictate decisions I make for the rest of my life?"

Matthews advised Lawrence that double agents from Russia feel "a dread of discovery, a dread of being arrested, a dread of going to prison." Lawrence also studied ballet for four months. Kurt Froman of the New York City Ballet coached her, as she had never studied ballet before, and spent four hours with her each day for five days per week. American Ballet Theatre principal dancer Isabella Boylston acted as Lawrence's dance double.

As a former member of the CIA, Matthews coached actor Joel Edgerton. Edgerton said it was difficult to consider having "an interpersonal dating-style relationship ... [and] That fact that you would have to report any of those kinds of interactions with your bosses." Matthias Schoenaerts and Jeremy Irons joined the cast by December 2016.

Filming

Principal photography started in Budapest and Dunaújváros in Hungary on January 5, 2017. Other filming locations include Festetics Mansion in Dég, Hungary; Bratislava, Slovakia and Vienna, Austria.

Post-production
In post-production, Francis Lawrence offered Jennifer Lawrence the opportunity to view a cut of the film ahead of the studio and producers, so that she might request the deletion of any nude or sexual scenes. She declined to request any deletions. However, the film was edited for the United Kingdom release to remove a garroting and secure a 15 certificate from the British Board of Film Classification.

For the soundtrack, the 1868 Piano Concerto by Edvard Grieg was used. James Newton Howard wrote the score, recorded in October 2017, citing Wolfgang Amadeus Mozart's Requiem and Igor Stravinsky's The Firebird as influences. He commenced work before seeing a cut of the film.

Release
The film was originally scheduled to be released by 20th Century Fox on November 10, 2017, but in April 2017 it was announced that the film's release would be pushed back to March 2, 2018, because it was seen as a less competitive one. The studio's adaptation of Murder on the Orient Express was moved into Red Sparrows November slot. The first trailer for the film was released on September 14, 2017. The film premiered on February 15, 2018, at the Newseum, and began a U.S. theatrical release on March 2.

Red Sparrow screened at FEST in Belgrade on February 28, 2018. It was released in the United Kingdom on March 1, 2018.

Home media
Red Sparrow was released on digital streaming platforms on May 15, 2018. It was released on 4K UHD Blu-ray, Blu-ray and DVD on May 22, 2018.

Reception

Box office
Red Sparrow grossed $46.8 million in the United States and Canada, and $104.7 million in other territories, for a worldwide total of $151.5 million, against a production budget of $69 million.

In the United States and Canada, Red Sparrow was released alongside Death Wish, and was projected to gross $20–24 million from 3,056 theaters in its opening weekend. It made $6 million on its first day (including $1.2 million from Thursday night previews) and $17 million over the weekend, finishing second, behind holdover Black Panther. Deadline Hollywood noted the opening was underwhelming given the film's $69 million budget, and that Lawrence's salary of $15–20 million was too much to spend on one star. It fell 51% in its second weekend to $8.15 million, finishing fourth.

Critical response

The website's critical consensus reads, "Red Sparrow aims for smart, sexy spy thriller territory, but Jennifer Lawrence's committed performance isn't enough to compensate for thin characters and a convoluted story." On Metacritic, the film has a weighted average score of 53 out of 100, based on 51 critics, indicating "mixed or average reviews". Audiences polled by CinemaScore gave the film an average grade of "B" on an A+ to F scale.

Manohla Dargis of The New York Times found the film to be "preposterously entertaining" and credited its success to Lawrence's performance, writing that "like all great stars, [Lawrence] can slip into a role as if sliding into another skin, unburdened by hesitation or self-doubt." IndieWire's Eric Kohn, who graded the film a B, noted the performances of Lawrence and Rampling, stating that "the considerable talent on display is [the film's] constant saving grace." However, he also found that the film "doesn't know when to stop, sagging into bland torture scenes and an underwhelming final showdown." Giving the film a B−, The A.V. Clubs Jesse Hassenger noted its methodical nature, with its minimal action and character exploration, and remarked that Francis Lawrence "brings to this material what he brought to The Hunger Games: a sense of style that feels constrained by obligations to hit a certain number of plot points."

Alonso Duralde of TheWrap criticized the derivative story and the lack of chemistry between Lawrence and Edgerton, calling the film "neither intelligent enough to be involving nor fun enough to be trashy." Michael Phillips of the Chicago Tribune gave the film 1.5 out of 4 stars and said, "Half of the Red Sparrow audience will spend at least part of the running time fighting off memories of Salt and Atomic Blonde and the Black Widow storyline from The Avengers. The other half, meantime, will wonder when spy movies became quite so punishing." Simran Hans of The Guardian found the film to be sexist, writing that "it busies itself with the grim surface pleasures of ogling its central character as she is degraded in every way possible."
Emily Gaudette of Newsweek called the film a "sadistic torture porn" and went on to ask "how many naked women need to be assaulted in a film before a director has made his point? ... for Francis Lawrence, the answer is a pile so big it's impossible to tell the victims apart."

The estimation reported by Russian publications was lower than the global average. According to Megacritic, the average score was 4.7 out of 10 based on more than 30 reviews.

Accolades

Historical accuracy
According to The Daily Telegraph, "The espionage historian Nigel West — whose Historical Dictionary of Sexspionage (Scarecrow Press) was originally written as a handbook for the intelligence community — questions the existence of such training schools".

Proposed sequel
Director Francis Lawrence and actor Joel Edgerton have been open to the possibility of a sequel based on either Palace of Treason or The Kremlin's Candidate.

References

External links
 
 

2018 films
2018 thriller films
2010s spy thriller films
20th Century Fox films
American rape and revenge films
American spy thriller films
Chernin Entertainment films
Films about ballet
Films about the Central Intelligence Agency
Films about the Russian Mafia
Films based on American thriller novels
Films directed by Francis Lawrence
Films produced by Peter Chernin
Films produced by Steven Zaillian
Films scored by James Newton Howard
Films set in Budapest
Films set in London
Films set in Moscow
Films set in Virginia
Films shot in Budapest
Films shot in Hungary
Films shot in London
Films shot in Slovakia
Films shot in Vienna
Films with screenplays by Justin Haythe
Girls with guns films
Techno-thriller films
2010s English-language films
2010s American films